Agriculture in the Southwest United States is very important economically in that region.

Watershed
The three main watersheds of the southwest United States are the Colorado River Basin, the Great Basin, and the Rio Grande Basin.  The Colorado River Basin includes parts of California, Utah, Arizona, New Mexico, Colorado, and Wyoming.  The Colorado River is the largest river in the Southwest United States.  The Great Basin watershed includes parts of southern California, most of Utah, the northwest half of Nevada, and parts of Oregon and Idaho.  The Rio Grande Basin includes most of New Mexico, some of western Texas, and a small portion of Colorado.

Almost all of Arizona drains into the Colorado River.  Most of New Mexico drains into either the Rio Grande or the Pecos River, its tributary.  Other watersheds of New Mexico include the Canadian River in the northeast, the San Juan in the Northwest, and the Gila (tributary of Colorado River) in the southwest.

Geography and climate
The southwest United States has a very rugged and diverse geography, including the Rocky Mountains in the north, a large amount of rangeland, and deserts to the south.  The Southwest United States also receives more sunlight than any other region of the United States, so it is warmer on average.

Arizona
There are two main physiographic regions which Arizona is a part of.  North and east Arizona is part of the Colorado Plateau, and the Basin and Range is in southern and western Arizona.

The Colorado Plateau is a flat, elevated land of soft sedimentary rock about 5,000 to 9,000 feet above sea level.  Rivers cut deep canyons and gorges into the plateau, the largest of which is the Grand Canyon of the Colorado River, which is in the northwest corner of Arizona.  There are also scattered mountains and mesas throughout the mostly flat plateau.  The highest mountains in Arizona are the San Francisco Mountains in the northern part of Arizona.

Almost all of Arizona lies in the Colorado River Basin.  The largest tributary to the Colorado in Arizona is the Gila, which crosses the southern part of the state and meets the Colorado River at Yuma.  The Salt River is the principal river of the Gila.  There is usually little or no flow of water at the junction of these rivers because of heavy use upstream.

In Arizona, there is little rainfall and low humidity.  Annual precipitation varies from 2 to 14 inches throughout most of the state.  The mountains of Arizona can receive as much as 30 inches.  There are huge fluctuations in temperature between day and night.  Temperatures frequently reach 100 °F in the summer, and they can fall as low as 0 °F in the winters in the Plateau Region.  The Plateau Region is generally cooler than the southern Basin and Range.

Nevada
Nevada has some mountains in the north, but a majority of the state is rangeland and desert, being that most of the state resides within the Great Basin.  There are three main geographic regions of Nevada:  the Columbia Plateau, the Sierra Nevada, and the Basin and Range.  Nevada receives less than 10 inches of rainfall per year, on average.

The Columbia Plateau is in the northeast part of  Nevada.  This land is supported by lava bedrock, and there are many deep rivers and canyons entrenched into the landscape.  There is also prairie land near the Idaho border.

The Sierra Nevada is the mountain range which cuts across Nevada, running south of Carson City.  A popular tourist attraction in the Sierra Nevada is Lake Tahoe, the largest alpine lake in North America.  Lake Tahoe is very popular in the Southwest for its water sports in the summer, and the surrounding mountains have beautiful slopes which are great for hiking, or skiing in the winter.

The majority of Nevada is described as the Basin and Range region.  This region lies between over 150 mountain ranges which run north to south through the state.  This region is to the east of the Sierra Nevada.  Between all of these mountain ranges are vast grasslands, with scattered buttes and mesas.  There are also some alkali flats in the region.

New Mexico
New Mexico is covered by four main regions:  the Rocky Mountains, the Great Plains, the Colorado Plateau, and the Basin and Range.  The Rocky Mountains cover north-central New Mexico and consist of southward mountain ranges coming from Colorado.  The three main mountain ranges are the Sangre de Cristo Mountains in the east and the San Juan and Jemez mountains in the west.  Between these western and eastern ranges lies the Rio Grande Valley.  The mountains of northern New Mexico stand 10,000 to 13,000 feet tall.

The Great Plains are in eastern New Mexico.  The northernmost section of this region is hilly and contains some lavacapped mesas and buttes.  South of the Canadian River, the land is very flat.  This region is referred to as the Llano Estacado, or the Staked Plain.  West of the Llano Estacado is the Pecos Valley which stretches about 250 miles along the Pecos River.  The Pecos Valley is low in elevation and flat, with some mesas and canyons.  The lowest point in the state, Red Bluff Lake on the Pecos River, is 2817 feet above sea level.

The Basin and Range region is in southwest New Mexico and a thin stretch goes northeast to Santa Fe.  This region consists of barren mountain ranges spaced with dry basins.  Most mountain ranges in this region are rounded and relatively low.  The basins of this area contain salt flats, sand dunes, and lava flows.

Most of New Mexico's main rivers carry little water for most of the year, with varying seasonal flows.  Because of the undependable water supply, some rivers in New Mexico have been dammed to provide water for irrigation, power, domestic use, and recreation.  New Mexico is very dry in most places except the mountains.  The climate is known as a middle-latitude steppe climate.

The mountains of New Mexico receive from 20 to 25 inches of rainfall per year.  The Great Plains receive from 12 to 16 inches, and the southern and western portion of the state receive as little as 8 inches.  Most of this rainfall occurs during summer thunderstorms.

Native vegetation

New Mexico
New Mexico's mountain ranges support a wide variety of plant life.  In the Rocky Mountains, the slopes have forests of Douglas fir, ponderosa pine, and aspen trees at lower elevations.  At higher elevations, the forests include Engelmann spruce, firs, Rocky Mountain white pine, and various aspens.  Above the timberline of the mountains is alpine tundra.  Most other mountain ranges in New Mexico predominantly include ponderosa pine and Douglas firs.
sh]], yuccas, cacti, and creosote bushes.

Arizona
On the mountain slopes of Arizona, there are forests of Ponderosa pine, firs, and other evergreen trees.  These trees, especially the Ponderosa pine, are the main source of Arizona's commercial timber.  At lower elevations, the main natural trees are the pinyon, juniper, and oak.

Nevada
Nevada has vegetation similar to New Mexico and Arizona in many ways.  Desert shrub ecosystems, of which sagebrush makes a huge part, cover nearly  55 million acres of the land.  About 14 percent (or 9.2 million acres) of Nevada lies in Pinyon-Juniper forests, and the mountainous regions are covered with coniferous or alpine trees, depending on the altitude.

History of agriculture

Native Americans have been in the Southwest United States for at least 12,000 years.  Although the agricultural practices of ancient Native Americans is largely unknown in the area, it is known that agriculture was widespread by the arrival of the Pueblos by 100 BC at the latest.  The Pueblos relied heavily on hunting and fishing for sustenance at first, only growing pumpkins and corn.  They stored their food in pits, and lived in either caves or huts made out of wooden poles and clay.

Around 500 CE, the Pueblos began growing beans and domesticated the turkey and duck.  It was around this time that agriculture became as important a part of survival as hunting and fishing, because they had a slightly more diverse agricultural diet.  Once agriculture became more prevalent and useful, the Pueblos began to group together in larger numbers, forming groups of many connected houses, with basements full of stored food.

Between 1000 and 1500 CE, Native American agriculture expanded greatly.  Around this time, the Navajos and Apaches became the largest population in the area.  They began to grow cotton, melons, squash, and chili peppers in addition to corn, beans, and pumpkins.

The Native Americans in the Southwest used the most advanced agricultural techniques available at the time.  They frequently employed the use of irrigation, crop rotation, and windbreaks to maximize their crop yield.  These techniques were presumably borrowed from the people of Mexico and the Andes in the south.  When the Spaniards arrived in North America in the 1500s, they brought bananas, wheat, sheep, and cows.  All of these were incorporated into the diet of many Native American tribes of the Southwest.

Modern agriculture
Today, agriculture is vastly different from before Europeans came to the Americas.  Because the Southwest United States is so dry and hot and the soil is inadequate compared to places like the Great Plains in the Midwest, much of the Southwest is used for grazing livestock.  In fact, almost 60 percent of the land in Nevada is used for livestock grazing, and at least 35 percent in New Mexico and Arizona.  Conversely, Nevada has the smallest amount of land used for crop production, while New Mexico has the most.

Although there is a small amount of land that is specified as being dedicated to the growing of crops in the Southwest, crop production does play a large part in their economy.  First of all, much of the land designated as cattle grazing land is also used to grow alfalfa hay.  This is used to feed livestock, so cattle and sheep farmers tend to grow it to feed their animals, and sell it when they are in excess.

Livestock
In New Mexico, as in Arizona and Nevada, livestock is the principal economic generator in their agricultural industry.  In 2007, the state produced over $3.0 billion worth of cattle and sheep.  Of that, $1.3 billion was from the dairy industry, while $951 million was from the beef industry.  That year, there were 1.5 million cattle and 130,000 sheep in the state.

Arizona's livestock industry comprises over one third of its $2.4 billion annual industry.  Nevada's main agricultural output is also beef, followed by hay and dairy products.

Crops
Most of the cropland in the Southwest United States is used to grow hay.  This is mainly because there are better places in the United States to grow soil-intensive crops, such as the Great Plains and much of California.  In New Mexico, 1.55 million tons of hay were grown in 2007.  In Nevada, over 90 percent of the cropland is used to grow hay.  Alfalfa hay is also the number one crop of Arizona.  In 2008, Arizona's hay crop sold for $288 million.

Other than hay, the southwestern states do produce a good amount of crops which grow well in warm climates.  Arizona's crops, excluding hay, make about $1.9 billion per year.  Cotton, lettuce, and wheat are the largest contributors in terms of money, but they also produce a significant amount of potatoes, lemons, tangerines, and cantaloupes.  Over 49,000 dry tons of chili peppers were grown in New Mexico in 2007, 35 million pounds of peanuts were grown, and 63,000 acres were used for onion production.  New Mexico is also a significant producer of pinto beans and grapes.  Since Nevada uses 90 percent of its cropland to grow hay, it is not a major contributor to other crops.  Nevada does grow potatoes, wheat, barley, and onions, as the rest of the southwest states do.  They also grow mint and garlic.

Arizona Extension recommends cultivars for tree crops in the Low Desert region, including a few which have been tested and proven viable:

 Apples: Anna, Beverly Hills, Ein shemer, Golden Dorsett, Gordon.

 Apricot: Katy, Patterson.

 Fig: Black Mission, Brown Turkey, White Conadria, White Kadota.

 Peaches: Bonanza Miniature, Babcock, Desert Gold, Desert Red, Earligrande, Flordaprince, Tropic Beauty, Tropic Snow, Tropic Sweet.

 Plums: Gulf Gold, Gulf Ruby, Santa Rosa.

 Almonds: All-in-One, Garden Prince Genetic Dwarf.

 Pecans: Neplus Ultra, Cheyenne, Choctaw, Comanche, Sioux, Western Schley, Wichita.

 Grapes: Cardinal, Exotic, Fantasy, Flame seedless, Perlette, Ruby seedless, Thompson seedless.

 Blackberries: Brazos, Rosborough.

 Strawberries: Camerosa, Chandler, Sequoia, Tioga.

Agricultural practices
The Southwest employs the heaviest irrigation of any region, since the region is hot and dry, and the soil is generally not as conducive to plant growth as other areas of the country.  Despite this, the Southwestern United States suffers from water shortages and droughts despite the already employed irrigation systems.

Environmental impact
It has been estimated that livestock, namely cattle, make up about 16 percent of human-caused carbon dioxide emissions.  Also, although cropland takes up a small portion of land, irrigation for crops accounts for 80 percent of water consumption in the Southwest.  A lot of this water is coming from the Colorado River, which is already almost completely used up by the time the water reaches Mexico.  About half of irrigation water comes from groundwater in the Southwest, and this is also being used much faster than it is being replenished.  If climate change raises the temperatures in the Southwest, then this will increase the amount of water that evaporates from the soil, plants, and bodies of water.  Since the 1970s more water has been evaporated from reservoirs than is used by humans.

References

External links
Development of Dryland Farming in Various Regions
Dryland Agriculture-Second Edition
Improving the Sustainability of Dryland Farming Systems: A Global Perspective
The Impact of Global Warming on US Agriculture: An Econometric Analysis
Moisture Management becomes critical for Southwest agriculture
Native Peoples of North America: Agricultural Societies in Pre-European Times: Southwestern US and Northwestern Mexico
Enduring Seeds: Native American Agriculture and Wild Plant Conservation (Gary Nabhan)
Sustainable Agriculture in the Southwest United States and its relationship to landscape planning
American Agriculture answering the call for energy independence
Major Crops Grown in the US
Top Crops: Southwest
Land Use Trends in the Southwestern US

Agriculture in the United States
Southwestern United States